Ka Choun is a commune in Veun Sai District in northeast Cambodia. It contains six villages and has a population of 1,397. In the 2007 commune council elections, all five seats went to members of the Cambodian People's Party. Land alienation is a problem of moderate severity in Ka Choun. (See Ratanakiri Province for background information on land alienation.)

Villages

References

Communes of Ratanakiri province